The 2014 FIA International Hill Climb Cup was the first edition of the FIA International Hill Climb Cup, after the merging of the FIA European Hill Climb Cup and the FIA International Hill Climb Challenge. The season consisted of fourteen rounds, starting on 27 April with the Subida Internacional Ubrique Benaocaz in Spain, and ended on 5 October with the Bergrennen Mickhausen in Germany.

In Category 1, Bulgaria's Nikolay Zlatkov was the inaugural champion, winning three events during the season. He won the championship by 35 points ahead of Italian driver Fulvio Giuliani, who also won three events. Third place in the championship went to Karl Schagerl of Austria, who won his home event of the Sankt Andrae. The remaining events were shared between Igor Drotár, Andreas Gabat, Raúl Borreguero, Tomasz Nagorski and Tiago Reis, while Fausto Bormolini won the last two events during the season, but was ineligible to score championship points. In Category 2, Václav Janík of the Czech Republic was crowned champion by 21 points ahead of Switzerland's Tiziano Riva with another Czech driver, Jiří Svoboda, edging out Simone Faggioli by half a point for third place in the final championship standings.

Calendar

Event results

See also
 European Hill Climb Championship
 Hillclimbing
 Mont Ventoux Hill Climb

References

External links
  - website about Czech and European hill climbs
  - Most complete European Hill Climb Championship race results 1957-today by ing. Roman Krejčí

Hillclimbing series
Hill Climb Cup
International Hill Climb Cup